Hirur is a village in Belgaum district in the southern state of Karnataka, India.

It has a population of 3031, including 608 families and 430 aged between 0 and 6.

Hirur's literacy rate is 64.36%

References

Villages in Belagavi district